Y Drych (established in 1851) was a weekly Welsh language newspaper published by Mather Jones. It contained news and information, focusing on religious matters. In 2003 it merged with Ninnau, another North American Welsh newspaper.

References

Welsh-language newspapers
Publications established in 1850